Teredolites is an ichnogenus of trace fossil, characterized by borings in substrates such as wood or amber.

Club-shaped structures rimming mid-Cretaceous Burmese amber were formerly identified as the fungal sporocarps Palaeoclavaria burmitis. a 2018 study re-identified the structures as domichnia (crypts) bored in the amber nodules by bivalves of the pholadid subfamily Martesiinae.  The borings are comparable with Teredolites clavatus and Gastrochaenolites lapidicus . Due to the substrate of the Myanmar borings being amber, the term Amberground was coined.

See also
 Ichnology

References

External links
 Chuck D. Howell's Ichnogenera Photos

Boring fossils
Paja Formation